An incomplete list of events which occurred in Italy in 1315:

Events 

 Battle of Montecatini

Deaths 
 Andrea Dotti (saint)
 Pisano

References 

Italy
Italy
Years of the 14th century in Italy